This is a list of historic places in Gaspésie-Îles-de-la-Madeleine, Quebec, entered on the Canadian Register of Historic Places, whether they are federal, provincial, or municipal. All addresses are the administrative Region 11. For all other listings in the province of Quebec, see List of historic places in Quebec.

Gaspesie
Gaspésie–Îles-de-la-Madeleine